The Subantarctic snipe (Coenocorypha aucklandica) is a species of snipe endemic to New Zealand's subantarctic islands. The Maori call it "Tutukiwi". The nominate race C. a. aucklandica (Auckland snipe) is found on the Auckland Islands (excluding the main island). Other subspecies include C. a. meinertzhagenae (Antipodes snipe) from the Antipodes Islands, and C. a. perseverance (Campbell snipe) from Campbell Island. The former subspecies from the Snares Islands has been separated as a full species, the Snares snipe (C. huegeli), as have the extinct South Island (C. iredalei) and North Island snipes (C. barrierensis).

Description
The head is striped in black and reddish brown and the body is brown, mottled with black and reddish brown.

Distribution
The Subantarctic snipe is endemic to certain islands to the south of New Zealand. Each island or group of islands has its own subspecies. New Zealand formerly had two mainland species of snipe, but both of these are extinct. The South Island snipe (C. iredalei) became extinct on Jacky Lee Island when the flightless weka was introduced and on Big South Cape Island (both the former and the latter muttonbird islands south of Stewart Island), its last refuge  after black rats (Rattus rattus) arrived there in 1964. The last North Island  Snipe (C. barrierensis) was seen in 1870 on Little Barrier Island. The Campbell Island Snipe (C. a. perseverance) were nearly extinguished but a few remained on an outlying islet and recolonised the main island when rats were exterminated there. A further two subspecies are the Antipodes snipe(C. a. meinertzhagenae) on the Antipodes Islands and the Auckland Island snipe(C. a. aucklandica) on the Auckland Islands. The Snares Island snipe (Coenocorypha huegeli) was formerly thought to be a subspecies of the Subantarctic snipe, but is now recognised as a separate species.

Behaviour
The Subantarctic snipe seldom flies, is relatively tame and nests on the ground and this puts it at risk of predation by land-based predators. It favours areas of dense ground cover and feeds on a range of invertebrates. It has a characteristic courtship display which takes place at night when males make vertical dives from considerable heights. Nesting takes place at different dates between August and January on the different islands.

References

 Miskelly, Colin M. (1987): The identity of the hakawai. Notornis 34(2): 95-116. PDF fulltext
 Miskelly, Colin M.; Bell, Elizabeth A.; Elliott, Graeme P. & Walker, Kath J. (2006): 'Hakawai' aerial displaying by three populations of subantarctic snipe (genus Coenocorypha). Notornis 53(4): 375–381. HTML abstract

Endemic birds of New Zealand
Coenocorypha
Birds described in 1845
Taxa named by George Robert Gray
Shorebirds